The Charterhouse of Parma may refer to:
The Charterhouse of Parma
The Charterhouse of Parma (film)
La chartreuse de Parme (opera)